The 2001 Oklahoma Wranglers season was the seventh and ultimately final season for the Arena Football League franchise, and the second in Oklahoma City. The team was coached by Bob Cortese and played their home games at The Myriad in Oklahoma City. The Wranglers came off a 7–7 record from the previous season and a loss in the second round of the AFL playoffs. They finished the season with a 5–9 record.

Schedule

Regular season

After the season
During the season owner, Ed Gatlin forfeited ownership of the franchise. The League gained control of the franchise. After an unsuccessful attempt to find new ownership for the team, the league folded the Wranglers in November. The team has no connection to the Austin Wranglers an Arena Football League team from 2004 to 2008.

See also
2001 Arena Football League season

References

Oklahoma Wranglers
Oklahoma Wranglers seasons
Oklahoma W